Particle collection in wet scrubbers capture relatively small dust particles with the wet scrubber's large liquid droplets. In most wet scrubbing systems, droplets produced are generally larger than 50 micrometres (in the 150 to 500 micrometres range). As a point of reference, human hair ranges in diameter from 50 to 100 micrometres. The size distribution of particles to be collected is source specific.
For example, particles produced by mechanical means (crushing or grinding) tend to be large (above 10 micrometres); whereas, particles produced from combustion or a chemical reaction will have a substantial portion of small (less than 5 micrometres) and submicrometre particles.

The most critical sized particles are those in the 0.1 to 0.5 micrometres range because they are the most difficult for wet scrubbers to collect.

Droplet production
Droplets are produced by several methods:
Injecting liquid at high pressure through specially designed nozzles
Aspirating the particle-laden gas stream through a liquid pool
Submerging a whirling rotor in a liquid pool.

These droplets collect particles by using one or more of several collection mechanisms such as impaction, direct interception, diffusion, electrostatic attraction, condensation, centrifugal force and gravity. However, impaction and diffusion are the main ones.

Impaction
 In a wet scrubbing system, dust particles will tend to follow the streamlines of the exhaust stream. However, when liquid droplets are introduced into the exhaust stream, particles cannot always follow these streamlines as they diverge around the droplet (Figure 1). The particle's mass causes it to break away from the streamlines and impact or hit the droplet.

Impaction increases as the diameter of the particle increases and as the relative velocity between the particle and droplets increases. As particles get larger they are less likely to follow the gas streamlines around droplets. Also, as particles move faster relative to the
liquid droplet, there is a greater chance that the particle will hit a droplet. Impaction is the predominant collection mechanism for scrubbers having gas stream velocities greater than 0.3 m/s (1 ft/s) (Perry 1973).

Most scrubbers operate with gas stream velocities well above 0.3 m/s. Therefore, at these velocities, particles having diameters greater than 1.0 µm are collected by this mechanism.
Impaction also increases as the size of the liquid droplet decreases because the presence of more droplets within the vessel increases the probability that particles will impact on the droplets.

Diffusion

 Very small particles (less than 0.1 µm in diameter) experience random movement in an exhaust stream. These particles are so tiny that they are bumped by gas molecules as they move in the exhaust stream. This bumping, or bombardment, causes them to first move one way and then another in a random manner, or to diffuse, through the gas. This irregular motion can cause the particles to collide with a droplet and be collected (Figure 2). Because of this, diffusion is the primary collection mechanism in wet scrubbers for particles smaller than 0.1 µm.

The rate of diffusion depends on the following:

The relative velocity between the particle and droplet
The particle diameter
The liquid-droplet diameter.

For both impaction and diffusion, collection efficiency increases with an increase in relative velocity (liquid- or gas-pressure input) and a decrease in liquid-droplet size.

 However, collection by diffusion increases as particle size decreases. This mechanism enables certain scrubbers to effectively remove the very tiny particles (less than 0.1 µm).
In the particle size range of approximately 0.1 to 1.0 µm, neither of these two collection mechanisms (impaction or diffusion) dominates. This relationship is illustrated in Figure 3.

Other collection mechanisms

In recent years, some scrubber manufacturers have utilized other collection mechanisms such as electrostatic attraction and condensation to enhance particle collection without increasing power consumption. 

In electrostatic attraction, particles are captured by first inducing a charge on them. Then, the charged particles are either attracted to each other, forming larger, easier-to-collect particles, or they are collected on a surface.

Condensation of water vapor on particles promotes collection by adding mass to the particles. Other mechanisms such as gravity, centrifugal force, and direct interception slightly affect particle collection.

Bibliography

Bethea, R. M. 1978. Air Pollution Control Technology. New York: Van Nostrand Reinhold.
National Asphalt Pavement Association. 1978. The Maintenance and Operation of Exhaust Systems in the Hot Mix Batch Plant. 2nd ed. Information Series 52.
Perry, J. H. (Ed.). 1973. Chemical Engineers’ Handbook. 5th ed. New York: McGraw-Hill.
Richards, J. R. 1995. Control of Particulate Emissions (APTI Course 413). U.S. Environmental Protection Agency.
Richards, J. R. 1995. Control of Gaseous Emissions. (APTI Course 415). U.S. Environmental Protection Agency.
Schifftner, K. C. 1979, April. Venturi scrubber operation and maintenance. Paper presented at the U.S. EPA Environmental Research Information Center. Atlanta, GA.
Semrau, K. T. 1977. Practical process design of particulate scrubbers. Chemical Engineering. 84:87-91.
U.S. Environmental Protection Agency. 1982, September. Control Techniques for Particulate Emissions from Stationary Sources. Vol. 1. EPA 450/3-81-005a.
Wechselblatt, P. M. 1975. Wet scrubbers (particulates). In F. L. Cross and H. E. Hesketh (Eds.), Handbook for the Operation and Maintenance of Air Pollution Control Equipment. Westport: Technomic Publishing.

References

External links
The Encyclopedia Of Filters - Dust Collection An overview of the science of dust collection systems, including Wet Scrubbers. 

Air pollution control systems
Wet scrubbers